John Wilkes Esq. is an etched print of 1763 by the British artist William Hogarth. It depicts British radicalist politician John Wilkes. Wilkes was the publisher of The North Briton, which had issues many a broadside against Hogarth's work. Wilkes sits with the "Cap of Liberty" and the "Staff of Maintenance". His mouth and eyes are construed and twisted, and his wig has morphed into devilish horns.

References

18th-century etchings
Works by William Hogarth
Metropolitan Museum of Art